During the 2009–10 Dutch football season, FC Twente competed in the Eredivisie.

Season summary
Twente won their first ever Eredivise title. Manager Steve McClaren departed for Bundesliga club VfL Wolfsburg and was replaced by Gent manager Michel Preud'homme.

Competitions

Eredivisie

League table

KNVB Cup

UEFA Champions League

UEFA Europa League

Qualifying rounds

Group stage

Round of 32

Kit
Twente's kit was manufactured by Italian brand Diadora and sponsored by Arke.

First-team squad
Squad at end of season

Left club during season

Reserves

References

Notes

FC Twente seasons
FC Twente

Dutch football championship-winning seasons